Khatra is a town in the state of West Bengal, India.

Khatra may also refer to:

Places
all located in India
 Khatra (community development block), an administrative division in the Khatra subdivision
 Khatra subdivision, in the Bankura district in the state of West Bengal
 Khatra Adibasi Mahavidyalaya, a college located here

Entertainment
 Khatra (album), a 2017 studio album by Nepalese rapper Yama Buddha
 Khatra (film), a 1991 Hindi horror fantasy film
 Khatra Khatra Khatra, an Indian comedy game show

See also
 
 Catra, a fictional character in the Masters of the Universe franchise
 Hatra, an ancient city in Upper Mesopotamia located in present-day Iraq
 Katra (disambiguation), various uses
 Khatarah, a town in northern Iraq